Robert Vernon (1774–1849) was an English contractor and businessman, known as a patron of art.

Life
Vernon was a self-made man, a jobmaster, posting contractor, and dealer in horses in London in a large way. He amassed a fortune as contractor for the supply of horses to the British armies during the Napoleonic wars.

Between 1820 and 1847 Vernon collected about 200 pictures by living British artists, with a few by other European painters. On 22 December 1847 he presented a selection of 157 pictures from his collection to the nation. This collection was housed at first in Marlborough House; it was moved to the South Kensington Museum, and in 1876 to the National Gallery in Trafalgar Square. It was subsequently split between the National Gallery and Tate Gallery. He also intended to give money in his will to support art and artists. In the event Leicester Viney Smith inherited from the unmarried Vernon, changing his surname to do so.

Vernon was a fellow of the Society of Antiquaries. He died at his house in Pall Mall, London on 22 May 1849, and was buried at Ardington, Berkshire, where he owned property.

Vernon Mona Lisa
One item of particular interest in the Vernon collection is the Vernon Mona Lisa, a painting of the same subject as the Mona Lisa in the Louvre, and which has at times been claimed to also have been painted by Leonardo da Vinci, as a second version of the work in the Louvre. The Vernon Mona Lisa is particularly interesting in this regard because it was itself originally part of the collection at the Louvre.

Notes

1774 births
1849 deaths
English businesspeople
Fellows of the Society of Antiquaries of London